SKES (Korean: 서광이에스) is a clean technology and construction engineering services company. Founded in 1994 and incorporated in 1997 by Young-Jik Park, the company has grown from a local electrical engineering consultancy firm into an multinational engineering services company, with businesses stretching from construction supervision in South Korea to LED lights manufacturing in Kyrgyzstan to solar power development in Japan.

The company, also called SKES Group, is the winner of the First Engineering Day President’s Award, the Ministry of Department Award, the Most Beautiful Corporation Award, and the Innovative Management Corporation Award in South Korea.

References

Construction and civil engineering companies established in 1994
South Korean companies established in 1994
Construction and civil engineering companies of South Korea